This is a list of Greenlandic artists who were born in or who live in Greenland.

A
 Ivalo Abelsen (born 1971), Nuuk
Naja Abelsen (born 1964), painter, illustrator, stamp designer
 Anne-Mette Arendt, Nuuk
 Aron of Kangeq (Inuit, 1822–1869), Kangeq, watercolors, woodcuts
 Pia Arke (1958–2007), photography, photocollage, installation
 Pierre André Auzias (French), Uummannaq

B

 Peter Jens Ville Berthelsen (1923–1990), Nuuk, painter, and Greenlandic flag contestant
 Aron Berthelsen (1933-2009), sculpture
 Esra Bertelsen (1889–1954), woodcarving
 Kelly Berthelsen (born 1967)
 Ivan Burkal (born 1955), Nuuk

C
 Bibi Chemnitz (Danish-Greenlandic), Copenhagen, Denmark, fashion design, printmaking
 Jørgen Chemnitz (1890-1956), photography
 Thue Christiansen (born 1940), painting, sculpture, designed the flag of Greenland in 1985

D
Mathias Ferslev Dalager  (Mathias Fersløv Dalager, Danish–Inuit, c. 1769–1843), Ritenbenk, painting
 Jakob Danielsen (born 1888 Sioraq, Disko Island, died 1938, Qeqertarsuaq), watercolors of hunting culture of north Greenland
 Arnajaraq Støvlbæk
 Kitora Sukuvara, stone carving

T 
 Christian Thygesen (Danish), painter
 Malene Guldager Thygesen (Danish-Kalaalleq), painter, sculptor

See also

 List of Danish painters
 Greenland National Museum
 Katuaq
 Nuuk Art Museum
 Sisimiut Museum
 Qaqortoq Museum
 Upernavik Museum

Notes

References
 Staffan, Carlen and Marianne Jensen, intro. Den Flyvende Kajak/The Flying Kayak/Qajaq Silaannakkoortoq (Contemporary Art from Greenland). Nordic Arts Centre, 1989. .

Further reading
 Goodnow, Katherine and Haci Akman. Scandinavian Museums and Cultural Diversity. Berghahn Books, 2008. .
 Kaalund, Bodil (Danish). The Art of Greenland: Sculpture, Crafts, Painting. Berkeley: University of California Press, 1984. .

External links
 KIMIK: Association of Artists in Greenland
 Nordic Institute in Greenland
 "Visions of Greenland appear in Venice", 2012
 "Greenland National Art Gallery", 2011
 "Jessie Kleemann & Iben Mondrup", Horizonic: Unfolding Space through Sound Art
 "South Greenland Culture Centre in Qaqortoq"

 
Greeland
Artists